Siphelele Luthuli (born 1 February 1995) is a South African professional soccer player who plays as a midfielder for South African Premier Division side Chippa United.

Club career
Luthuli is from Cato Manor, Durban. Having first joined their academy in 2009, He made his debut in the South African Premier Division with University of Pretoria in 2015, but they were relegated to the National First Division shortly after. In August 2017, he signed a one-year-deal with Highlands Park, before signing for Ubuntu Cape Town in July 2018. After a trial spell with South African Premier Division side Bloemfontein Celtic, he signed for the club in summer 2019.

International career
In November 2013, Luthuli received a call-up to the South Africa national under-20 team.

References

External links

1995 births
Living people
South African soccer players
Sportspeople from Durban
Association football midfielders
University of Pretoria F.C. players
Highlands Park F.C. players
Ubuntu Cape Town F.C. players
Bloemfontein Celtic F.C. players
Chippa United F.C. players
South African Premier Division players
National First Division players